Ab Bid-e Kusha (also Romanized as Āb Bīd-e Kūshā; also known as Ābbīd) is a village in Kuh Shah Rural District, Ahmadi District, Hajjiabad County, Hormozgan Province, Iran. At the 2006 census, its population was 234, in 56 families.

References 

Populated places in Hajjiabad County